Gebhard Ludwig Himmler (29 July 1898 – 22 June 1982) was a German Nazi functionary, mechanical engineer and older brother of Reichsführer-SS Heinrich Himmler.

Upbringing 

Gebhard Ludwig Himmler was born on 29 July 1898 in Munich, the first son of a schoolmaster who later became a headmaster, Joseph Gebhard Himmler (born 17 May 1865 in Lindau; died 29 October 1936 in Munich), and Anna Maria Heyder (born 16 January 1866 in Bregenz; died 10 September 1941 in Munich). His siblings were Heinrich Himmler (born 7 October 1900 in Munich; who committed suicide in British custody, 23 May 1945 in Lüneburg) and Ernst Hermann Himmler (born 23 December 1905 in Munich; died 2 May 1945).

On 3 November 1902 the family moved to Passau, where Joseph Gebhard Himmler taught Greek and Latin at the Königlich humanistisches Gymnasium.

From 1906 to 1908 he went to the Amalienschule and from 1909 to 1916 to the Wilhelmsgymnasium. In 1916, because he was still working on his , he was exempted from conscription in the Bavarian Army. In March, 1917 he took his Abitur early and passed.

On 18 September 1926 he married Mathilde Hilde Wendler, whom he had met at a ball held by the Apollo students' association. Their children were Irmgard (born 21 October 1927), Anneliese (born 16 October 1930) and Heide (born 13 March 1940 in Gmund am Tegernsee).

Wartime service and early career 
In 1917, Himmler passed an officer training course and, in May 1917, joined 16th Bavarian Infantry Regiment in Passau. In summer that year he participated in an exercise at Grafenwöhr, passed a Fahnenjunker course and, subsequently, a machine gunner's course in Lagerlechfeld. On 9 April 1918, Himmler arrived in Lorraine on the Western Front and then took part in the Battle of Château-Thierry, 65 km east from Paris, as a runner between battalion and regimental headquarters.

In 1919, after the end of the war, Himmler and his brother, Heinrich, left the Munich citizens' militia, the Einwohnerwehr, to join the 21st Rifle Brigade of the paramilitary Black Reichswehr under Franz Ritter von Epp. In early 1923, Himmler joined the Bund Reichskriegsflagge under Ernst Röhm, who took part in the Munich Putsch in November 1923.

From 15 January 1919 to July 1923, he took a course in mechanical engineering at the Technical University of Munich. From July 1923 to the introduction of the Rentenmark currency, Himmler worked for the Bavarian Mortgage and Exchange Bank (Bayerische Hypotheken- und Wechsel-Bank) for paper currency. From January 1925 he was an assistant teacher at the municipal vocational and technical school for precision engineering on Munich's ; from April 1925 he was appointed as a teacher there and taught technical drawing, physics and instrumentation.

Nazi functionary 

In order to avoid the appearance of being an opportunist, at his request the lower Nazi membership number of his wife was transferred to him. Before 30 January 1933, Himmler became the head of the Bavarian vocational schools association. This was transferred in 1933 into the National Socialist Teachers League (NSLB). Himmler became deputy and, subsequently, head of the Gau Students Association for the Gau of Upper Bavaria.

He trained as an officer and continued to work with the NSLB.

The VDI defined the guidelines for the award of the title "engineer". Himmler helped to shape this corporate representative body and exercised the state's political power in a discriminatory and party-political manner.

On 1 August 1939, Himmler was called up and assigned to the 19th Bavarian Infantry. He was deployed with his company to Czechoslovakia on the Polish border.

After the start of the Second World War on 1 September, he participated in the Invasion of Poland. The 19th Infantry was part of the 14th Army. At the end of the fighting, on 16 and 17 September, the regiment was located west of Lemberg (now Lviv), but was transferred to the Lower Rhine in October 1939.

On 12 July 1940, he was promoted from principal to director. From June 1940, Gebhard and Hilde Himmler lived with their family in the  street in the Berlin district of Friedenau. From August 1943, Himmler lived with his brother, Ernst, in Ruhleben in Berlin.

On 30 January 1944, Himmler became an SS- (SS-Nr. 214.049) and, on 30 March 1944, was promoted to SS- in the Waffen-SS and was employed as inspector of Waffen-SS schools.

Post-war 
Himmler was taken prisoner by the British Army near Kappeln on the Schlei. In early March 1946, he was interned at the Emil Köster Leather Factory in Gadeland; later, he was transferred to Bad Fallingbostel on the Lüneburg Heath. In 1948 he was moved to an internment camp in the  street in Munich.

Karl Hudezeck (1934–1945, headmaster of the Wittelsbacher-Gymnasium München) gave him a denazification certificate for the Nazi era. At a denazification panel he was assessed as Category II - Follower.

In the European-Afghan Cultural Office in Munich, Himmler, as director and engineer, worked as a study adviser and arranged internships for Afghan students. He was barred from working for the government and he was disqualified from his pension, but he successfully appealed this in 1959. He died in Munich on 22 June 1982, aged 83.

Publications 
 , in: , 6, 1938, pp. 313–315.
 , in: , 10, 1942: 496ff.
 , in: Institut für Auslandsbeziehungen. Mitteilungen 9–10/1954, pp. 243f.

Bibliography

References 

1898 births
1982 deaths
German mechanical engineers
Gebhard Ludwig
SS-Standartenführer
Waffen-SS personnel
Nazi Party politicians
Nazis who participated in the Beer Hall Putsch
20th-century Freikorps personnel
Engineers from Munich
Technical University of Munich alumni
German Army  personnel of World War I